This is a List of World War I cemeteries and memorials in Verdun.
Verdun saw a massive loss of life in several battles during the First World War, particularly the Battle of Verdun. Consequently, there are many French and German cemeteries throughout the battlefield and several memorials.

The Douaumont Ossuary
The Douaumont ossuary) is a memorial containing the remains of soldiers who died on the battlefield during the Battle of Verdun in World War I. It is located in Douaumont, France, within the Verdun battlefield and has been designated a "nécropole nationale", or "national cemetery".

The ossuary is a memorial containing the remains of both French and German soldiers who died on the Verdun battlefield. Through small outside windows, the skeletal remains of at least 130,000 unidentified soldiers of both nations can be seen filling up alcoves at the lower edge of the building. On the inside of the ossuary building, the ceiling and walls are partly covered by plaques bearing names of French soldiers who fell during the Battle of Verdun plus a few names of those who died fighting during World War II, as well as for veterans of the Indochina and Algerian Wars.

In front of the monument, and sloping downhill, lies the largest single French military cemetery of the First World War with 16,142 graves. It was initiated in 1923 by Verdun veteran André Maginot, who would later create the Maginot Line. The ossuary was officially inaugurated on 7 August 1932 by French President Albert Lebrun.

The architects of the ossuary were Léon Azéma, Max Edrei and Jacques Hardy and George Desvallières designed the stained glass windows. It was offered by an American benefactor Anne Thornburn Van Buren, in 1927. At the top of the tower a rotating red and white "lantern of the dead" shines on the battlefields at night.

Inside the cloister are 18 shelters each holding two granite tombs and each of these tombs represents an exact section of the battlefield and underneath, burial vaults hold the bones of the unidentified dead.

The setting up of the ossuary was organised by a committee led by the Bishop of Verdun who collected subscriptions within France and internationally. Around the outside of the building are displayed the coats of arms of all the cities which donated money towards it. In the gallery below are some further photographs of the ossuary and cemetery.

Le Soldat du Droit
This memorial comprises the sculpture of a reclining soldier, the work being entitled "Le Soldat du Droit" (The Soldier of Justice). It is dedicated to Andre Thomé, a French politician, who was killed at Verdun on 10 March 1916. His parliamentary occupation meant that he was not obliged to serve in the army but he had volunteered anyway.

Monument at Mort Homme and the Monument to the 40th French Infantry

This was the work of the sculptor Jacques Froment-Meurice and was erected by the veterans of the 69th French Infantry Division. The skeleton of a French soldier is draped in the flag for which he has sacrificed his life. He carries the flame of victory and the monument is inscribed  ring out the declaration of resistance.

The inauguration ceremony took place on 10 September 1922, in the presence of Generals Nivelle and Berthelot, Boichut, the Governor of Verdun and Mon.Taufflieb, the senator for the Bas-Rhin, who had commanded the 69th.

100 metres from this monument is the granite monument dedicated to the soldiers of the 40th French Infantry. A photograph is shown in the gallery at the end of the article.

Both monuments stand on Cote 304 which was a piece of high ground that had to be fought over. The memorials are dedicated to the more than 10,000 French Soldiers perished there. The hill was first attacked by the Germans on 20 March 1916 and again on 9 April 1916. Neither of these two attacks were successful but finally, on 29 June the Germans took the hill, and less than two months later the French were able to re-take it. On the right-hand side of the memorial to the 40th are listed the divisions that fought here in 1916 and on the left are those divisions who fought in 1917, when further fighting took place.

Jacques Froment-Meurice was born in Paris in 1864 and died in 1947. He was a pupil of Chapu. In 1925 he worked on the war memorial at Saumur.

Memorial to Muslim soldiers
This striking memorial is completely white in colour and is dedicated to the 70,000 Muslim soldiers who died whilst fighting for France at Verdun. It was inaugurated on 25 June 2006, the ceremony being led by Jacques Chirac, Michèle Alliot-Marie, the Minister of Defence, Hamlaoui Mekachera, the Secretary of State for Veteran soldiers, Jean-Louis Debré, Christian Poncelet and Dalil Boubakeur. The design of the memorial is inspired by Arab-Muslim art.

Memorial to 137th Regiment of Infantry/The Bayonet Trench
When the battlefield clearance parties began to search the Verdun area after the war, one party found what appeared to be a mass grave of men from one unit, the 137th Infantry Regiment. It was thought that they were killed in their "jumping off" trench when the intense German shelling literally buried them alive. The story was that Father Ratier, an army chaplain, who had been a stretcher bearer with the 137th in 1916, found a line of some thirty nine bayonets protruding from the ground: each one marking the location of a body and here the legend started and the spot is marked by a memorial known as the "Trench of Bayonets"

The monument carries at its front the words 

The door to the monument in green bronze was the work of Edgar Brandt and leads through to a colonnaded alley.

Memorial to Fleury-devant-Douaumont
Near the Douaumont ossuary is the memorial which remembers the lost village of Fleury-Devant-Douaumont, one of the many villages destroyed in the fighting but never rebuilt. The village had become a key position in the battle and changed hands 16 times and by July 1916 had been razed to the ground. It was never rebuilt and the memorial stands as a reminder of the horrors that the village must have witnessed. Several other villages suffered the fate of Fleury-devant-Douaumont, namely Bezonvaux, Beaumont-en-Verdunois, Haumont-près-Samogneux, Louvemont-Côte-du-Poivre, and Cumières-le-Mort-Homme.

During the war, the town was destroyed and the land was made uninhabitable to such an extent that a decision was made not to rebuild it. The area around the municipality was contaminated by corpses, explosives, and poisonous gas, so farming was impossible. The site of the commune is maintained as a testimony to war and is officially designated as a "village that died for France".

Mémorial de Verdun
Just by the Fleury-devant-Douaumont memorial is the Verdun memorial, a museum, built on the site of Fleury-deviant-Doaumont's old railway station. It was set up in 1967 on the initiative of the CNSV (Comité National du Souvenir de Verdun). It contains many artifacts found in the Verdun trenches and endeavors to tell the story of the daily life of those who fought at Verdun.

Maurice Genevoix, the writer, who fought in the 1914-1918 war, was one of those who pushed for the museum to be built, wrote

The wall of the Israelites at Fleury-devant-Douaumont

This monument stands between the Douaumont ossuary and the monument dedicated to the Jews who died at Verdun and is dedicated to the memory of those Jews who laid down their lives in the 1914-1918 war. The wall is 25 metres long and 15 metres high and is inscribed with the text of Hebrew Laws, reminding one of Jerusalem's "Wailing wall". The inscription reads 

The memorial says :

TO THE FRENCH, THE ALLIES AND THE FOREIGN VOLUNTARY ISRAELITES
-1914- DIED FOR FRANCE -1918-

The chapel of Saint-Nicolas at Fleury-devant-Douaumont
This chapel is called Notre-Dame-de-l'Europe and has stained glass windows by Jean-Jacques Gruber which depict two soldiers and a Pieta by Mr. Lucien Lantier and his wife.

Memorial to the men who maintained the Voie Sacrée at Moulin-Brûlé
The memorial to the men who maintained the Voie Sacrée, or Sacred Path, is located by the road in question and on the plateau of Moulin-Brûlé.
It was inaugurated on 14 May 1967 by General Boucaud, the president of the "Fédération du Train (FNT)" and has sculptural work by François Barrois of Commercy. It was designed by the architect Gaston Schmitt of Toul. The monument stands on the point where soldiers would arrive in trucks and then would walk the 8 kilometres to the front line. Barrois' relief depicts the various kinds of trucks used on the Voie Sacrée, the railway with a depiction of the Corpet-Louvet locomotive, and the men working on maintenance. In the centre of the relief the words inscribed read 

It was along this road that French men and supplies were fed to the fighting area. At one point it was calculated that vehicles were passing every fourteen seconds, day and night, to ensure that Verdun could withstand the massive onslaught that it was subjected to in 1916. It was for good reason considered the "road to Hell". Thousands and thousands of men passed along the Voie Sacrée each day and 2,000 tons of munitions. To ensure the road was kept clear all men on foot were obliged to march through the surrounding fields and to maintain the road surface a unit of soldiers, equal to a full division of men, threw down some 700,000 tonnes of stones during the 10 months of the battle. A narrow gauge railway ran alongside the road. The Voie Sacree is now marked along its length with posts capped with a model of a French soldier’s helmet. The posts tell the reader how far he is along the road from Bar-Le-Duc to Verdun.

The Memorial to André Maginot
Just near to the Douaumont Ossuary and Cemetery and in the forested part of Souville is the memorial to André Maginot. The bronze sculpture on the memorial shows the wounded Maginot being helped from the battlefield of Verdun by a fellow soldier François-Joseph Jolas. This memorial was inaugurated in 1935 by the French President Albert Lebrun. The sculptor was Gaston Bocquet. Maginot was the Deputy for Bar-Le-Duc and a Government Minister before the war and when war broke out he enlisted as an ordinary soldier and fought at Verdun, sustaining a bad knee injury. After the war Maginot returned to politics and as Minister of Pensions lit the flame of remembrance at the opening of the tomb of the unknown warrior under the Arc de Triomphe. Throughout his life he worked tirelessly for Great War veterans and his name will forever be associated with the "Maginot Line" the ring of fortresses on the eastern border with Germany built in the 1930s to defend France against future German attack.

Verdun Cathedral
Verdun Cathedral is one of the oldest cathedrals in Europe dating back to the year 990.

It was damaged by a bomb in 1916 and after the war much restoration was needed and the restorers André Ventre and Marcel Delangle were commissioned to supervise this restoration. Jean-Jacques Grüber was commissioned to work on the stained glass.

The crypt was quite unique and the restorers tried to change it as little as possible but one innovation was the commissioning in 1935 of the sculptor Gaston Le Bourgeois to carve the corbels of the crypt's pillars. This involved 13 corbels each having 4 sides, giving Le Bourgeois the task of completing 52 corbels.
He chose two subjects for these carvings; episodes from the Battle of Verdun and the religious life of the town.

We can observe therefore alongside the religious figures, a soldier smoking his pipe, a pigeon from Fort Vaux, the lorries of the Voie Sacrée, artillery pieces, a padre, aviators, and other such symbols. One carving shows a soldier blindfolded and on his knees awaiting execution.

Memorial to the men of the 130th Division at Douaumont
In the Douaumont area is the memorial to the men of the 130th Division who fought as part of the Souville Garrison. Its position at the site of the former ruins of the Chapel of Sainte-Fine marks the furthest that the Germans managed to advance towards Verdun in their attack of 12 July 1916.

Monument to the sons of Verdun
This monument is dedicated to the 518 men of Verdun who gave their lives in the 1914-1918 war. 510 were soldiers and 8 civilians. The architect was Forest and the sculptor and the monument took as its theme the words as the five soldiers form a solid wall against which the Germans must pit themselves.

Inaugurated on 1 November 1928, the monument depicts a line of five soldiers representing the different arms of the armed forces. From left to right, there is a cavalryman with his sabre, in the centre is a young, determined infantryman, followed by an old colonial soldier with his distinct moustache and finally an artilleryman.

A sign next to the monument gives the following information 

Now the monument bears not only the names of the 518 casualties of World War I, but both military and civilian victims of the Second World War, including deportees and resistance fighters and those who lost their lives in Algeria and overseas.

The sculptor was Claude Grange (1883-1971) whose work we have encountered on the Chemin des Dames and the Basque memorial there.

Monument to the victory at Verdun
This monument in Verdun was created by the French architect Léon Chesnay. The sculptor was Jean Boucher (1870-1939), who was himself a veteran of Verdun battle. The foundation stone of the monument was laid down in 1920 by War Minister André Lefèvre and the inauguration took place several years later on 23 June 1929, the ceremony being witnessed by Gaston Doumergue, the French President, Raymon Poincaré, the Prime Minister, several ministers and Pétain. Boucher's statue at the top of the monument depicts Charlemagne leaning on a large broadsword.

This monument is located at the summit of a stairway which links lower Verdun (rue Mazel) and upper Verdun (place de la Libération) and its pyramidal tower (30 m high) holds a crypt which was used to hold books with the names of those French and American soldiers who fought in this region (the books are now kept in the city hall). The crypt had been intended to hold the mortal remains of the 7 unknown soldiers who were not chosen during the 1920 ceremony to select the remains for the tomb of the unknown soldier in Paris but these remains are now in the Faubourg-Pavé military cemetery.

Le père Barnabé at Samogneux
"Le Père Barnabé" came to symbolise the people of the Meuse in 1914-1918.

It was the American Miss Horace Gray de Boston, who asked Henri Frémont for permission to translate and sell the book in the USA, and funds raised were used to rebuild the village. There is a monument entitled "Le père Barnabé" which was erected in 1930 in front of the ancient village church. This shows a Meuse peasant standing before the ruins of his village and this monument was funded by both Henri Frémont and Miss Gray.

Documents at the National Archives in Kew
In file WO 32/5649 held at the National Archives we read of the presentation of a Union Jack to the City of Verdun. The file opens in October 1917 and we learn that a Union Jack had been presented to the City of Verdun by General Cowans. and the Mayor of Verdun had written to the Foreign Office as follows:--
"The town of Verdun is proud to possess this testimony of admiration to the immortal soldiers who preserved it from the pollution of the enemy, but it would like to keep in its archives a written certificate conferring on it the guardianship of this flag".

The Secretary of State for War duly wrote the following letter to the Mayor of Verdun on 5 March 1918. "In fulfilment of the promise made by my predecessor, Mr.Lloyd George, when he visited Verdun, it is my pleasant duty and high privilege to ask you, M.le Maire, to accept the custody of the British Flag which Lieutenant General Sir John Cowans, Quarter Master General to the Forces, in the name of His Majesty the King and on behalf of the Army Council, handed to you on 20 September last. Animated by the sincerest feelings of admiration for the brilliant valour of which the city of Verdun was at once the scene and the inspiration, the British Army desire that this tribute to their comrades in arms may, by the permission of yourself, M.le Maire, and your successors in office, remain in your citadel to commemorate the definite repulse of a common enemy in the anxious but victorious months of February and March, 1916".

The fighting there in 1916 would see large numbers of French and German dead. General Petain wrote of the young troops returning from the battlefield

"They shall not pass"

The Battle of Verdun was to popularise General Robert Nivelle's: "They shall not pass" this being a simplification of the actual French text: "Vous ne les laisserez pas passer, mes camarades" ("you shall not let them pass, my comrades") which was part of Nivelle's " Order of the day" on the 23rd June, 1916.  About two months earlier, in April 1916, General Philippe Pétain had also issued a stirring "Order of the day" which is also often quoted 

Nivelle's words perhaps betrayed his concern for the mounting morale problems on the Verdun battlefield. The French military archives document that Nivelle's promotion to lead the Second Army at Verdun, in June 1916, had been followed by manifestations of indiscipline in five of his front lire regiments This unprecedented disquiet would eventually reappear with the French army mutinies that followed the unsuccessful Nivelle offensive of April 1917.

Gallery of Images

Further reading
 Brown, Malcolm Verdun 1916, Tempus Publishing, 1999, 
 Clayton, Anthony, Paths of Glory – The French Army 1914–18, 
 Illustrated Michelin Guide to the battlefields "Verdun and the Battles for its Possessions" .
 "The Price of Glory" Verdun 1916 .
 "Walking Verdun" .
 "Battlefield Guide VERDUN 1916" .

See also
List of World War I Memorials and Cemeteries in Lorraine
World War I Memorials and Cemeteries in Alsace
List of World War I memorials and cemeteries in the area of the St Mihiel salient
List of World War I memorials and cemeteries in Champagne-Ardennes
List of World War I memorials and cemeteries in the Somme
List of World War I memorials and cemeteries in Artois
List of World War I memorials and cemeteries in Flanders

References

External links
 Douaumont Official Site

Verdun
Verdun
Buildings and structures in Meuse (department)

National cemeteries
Ossuaries
Verdun
Tourist attractions in Meuse (department)
Alsace
Alsace
Memorials and Cemeteries in Alsace